Wei Wei (born 17 May 1922) is a Chinese actress. She is best known for her leading role in the classic film Spring in a Small Town (1948), and various other films from the 1940s to the 1960s. However, she has also continued to work into the late 20th and early 21st century. Wei turned 100 in May 2022.

Filmography

Nominations

See also
Cinema of China

References

External links
 

1922 births
Living people
Actresses from Jiangsu
People from Zhenjiang
20th-century Chinese actresses
21st-century Chinese actresses
Chinese film actresses
Chinese centenarians
Women centenarians